The Centre for Renaissance and Early Modern Studies (CREMS) was launched in October 2005 at the University of York. It is focused on the study of the 16th and 17th centuries. It brings together more than 40 academics and 60 postgraduate students from seven leading departments at York: English and Related Literature, History, History of Art, Archaeology, Music, Philosophy and Politics, Education, and Theatre, Film, Television and Interactive Media making it one of the largest centres of its kind in the UK. It is based at the university's Humanities Research Centre, which is located inside the Berrick Saul Building.

The centre offers an annual programme of seminars, conferences and public lectures relating to the Renaissance and Early Modern periods. It runs its own taught MA in Renaissance and Early Modern Studies for students taking postgraduate research degrees within the period.

The centre works closely with the Borthwick Institute for Archives and the university's new departments and institutes in the Humanities (particularly the Department of Film, Theatre and Television and the Institute for the Public Understanding of the Past), as well as with the York Minster Library, the Yorkshire Country House Project and the National Centre for Early Music. It is developing partnerships with institutions across the UK, Europe and North America. The current director of the centre is  Kevin Killeen.

External links
Centre for Renaissance and Early Modern Studies
University of York

University of York
Renaissance and early modern research centres
Early Modern period